Nationality words link to articles with information on the nation's poetry or literature (for instance, Irish or French).

Events

Works published

England
 Thomas Blundeville, translated from the Latin of Plutarch, Three Morall Treatises, first two treatises in verse
 Geoffrey Chaucer, The Woorkes of Geffrey Chaucer, edited by John Stow, based on the Tynne edition of 1532; see also Thomas Speght's edition of the Workes 1598)
 Barnabe Googe, translated from Marcello Palingenio Stellato's Zodiacus vitae [c. 1528]), The Zodiac of Life, Books 1–4, published in Latin and English (see also The Zodiac of Life 1560, 1565)

Other
 Jan Blahoslav, author and editor, Šamotulský kancionál ("Šamotulský hymn-book"), a "cantionale" or hymn-book; a Czech poet published in Polish (see also Ivančice hymn-book 1564, a revised edition)
 Julius Caesar Scaliger, Poetices libri septem ("Seven Books of Poetics"), Italian critic published in Lyon, France, very influential, but derivative criticism

Births
Death years link to the corresponding "[year] in poetry" article:
 January 22 – Francis Bacon (died 1626), English philosopher, statesman, scientist, lawyer, jurist, author and poet
 April 8 – Dominicus Baudius (died 1613), Dutch Neo-Latin poet, scholar and historian
 July 11 – Luis de Góngora (died 1627), Spanish lyric poet
 October 27 – Mary Herbert (died 1621), English poet, translator, patron, hostess of a literary salon, and sister of Philip Sidney
 Also:
 Gaspar Aguilar (died 1623), Spanish poet and dramatist
 Bernardo de Balbuena (died 1627), Spanish-born Latin American poet
 Henry Lok birth year uncertain (died 1608), English
 Nicolas de Montreux (died 1608), French nobleman, novelist, poet, translator and dramatist
 Robert Southwell year of birth uncertain (died 1595), English Jesuit priest and poet

Deaths
Birth years link to the corresponding "[year] in poetry" article:
 John Calvin (born 1509), Swiss, French-language Protestant religious leader who wrote hymns
 George Cavendish, (born either 1500 or 1494), English
 Nikolaus Herman (born c. 1500), German
 Olivier de Magny (born 1529), French
 Jorge de Montemayor (born 1521), Portuguese novelist and poet, who wrote almost exclusively in Spanish

See also

 Poetry
 16th century in poetry
 16th century in literature
 Dutch Renaissance and Golden Age literature
 Elizabethan literature
 French Renaissance literature
 Renaissance literature
 Spanish Renaissance literature

Notes

16th-century poetry
Poetry